Contumazá is a town in Northern Peru, capital of the province Contumazá in the region Cajamarca.

References

Populated places in the Cajamarca Region